Pseudendoclonium is a genus of green algae, in the family Kornmanniaceae.

References

Ulvophyceae genera
Ulvales